Mt. Memorial Cemetery, also known as The Old Gravevard, is a historic cemetery located on the campus of William Jewell College at Liberty, Clay County, Missouri.  It was established about 1828, and contains 554 documented burials.  The cemetery is rectangular in plan and measures approximately 140 feet by 435 feet.

It was listed on the National Register of Historic Places in 2012.

References

External links
 

 Liberty, Missouri: Mt. Memorial Cemetery History

Cemeteries on the National Register of Historic Places in Missouri
1828 establishments in Missouri
Buildings and structures in Clay County, Missouri
National Register of Historic Places in Kansas City, Missouri
Liberty, Missouri